Jack Edwards (born 1 March 1934) is  a former Australian rules footballer who played with Footscray in the Victorian Football League (VFL).

Notes

External links 
		

1934 births
Living people
Australian rules footballers from Victoria (Australia)
Western Bulldogs players